Oleksandr Vladyslavovych Holikov (born 13 November 1991) is a Ukrainian football player who plays for Košice.

Club career
He made his Ukrainian Second League debut for FC Shakhtar-3 Donetsk on 16 May 2008 in a game against PFC Shakhtar Sverdlovsk.

References

External links
 
 
 Profile at sportnet.sme.sk

1991 births
Footballers from Donetsk
Living people
Ukrainian footballers
Ukraine youth international footballers
Association football defenders
FC Shakhtar Donetsk players
FC Shakhtar-3 Donetsk players
FC Zorya Luhansk players
FC Olimpik Donetsk players
FC Makiyivvuhillya Makiyivka players
FC Enerhiya Nova Kakhovka players
PFC Sumy players
FC Arsenal Kyiv players
FC Poltava players
FC Lviv players
FC Chornomorets Odesa players
FC Obolon-Brovar Kyiv players
FC LNZ Cherkasy players
FC Košice (2018) players
Ukrainian Premier League players
Ukrainian First League players
Ukrainian Second League players
2. Liga (Slovakia) players
Ukrainian expatriate footballers
Expatriate footballers in Slovakia
Ukrainian expatriate sportspeople in Slovakia